The Sardar Vallabhbhai Patel Indoor Stadium is an indoor sports arena, in Mumbai, Maharashtra. The facility seats 5,000 people. Originally an outdoor stadium, it was established in 1957 and the foundation stone was laid by the former Chief Minister of Maharashtra, Yashwantrao Chavan; and the facility is administered by National Sports Club of India. It includes the facilities like  Tennis, Badminton, Billiards, Table Tennis, Badminton, Carrom and Wrestling.

In 2002, a team led by renowned architecture firm Shashi Prabhu & Associates and Sterling Engineers as their structural designers, planned an indoor stadium in place of the old open air stadium. The 5000 capacity indoor stadium with 16 ancillary halls was constructed there with a basement measuring almost 12 acres and accommodating 1000 car parking places. Today, the stadium houses a large health club and a gymnasium.

The stadium is host of the Indian Badminton League and is home of Mumbai Marathas.

Kabaddi
It is the home of the Pro Kabaddi League team U Mumba.

Badminton
The stadium is the home venue of the Premier Badminton League team, the Mumbai Masters.

Basketball
The first ever National Basketball Association (NBA) games in India took place on 4 and 5 October 2019 at the NSCI Dome. The NBA India Games 2019 featured two preseason games between the Sacramento Kings and Indiana Pacers, and marked the first time that teams from a North American sports league played in India.

Connectivity
The stadium can be reached by train. Nearest railway stations are Mahalaxmi and Lower Parel on the Western Line, and Chinchpokli on the Central Line.

References

External links 
 National Sports Club of India, Mumbai
 National Sports Club of India, Delhi

Tennis venues in India
Indoor arenas in India
Sports venues in Mumbai
Kabaddi venues in India
Sports venues completed in 1957
1957 establishments in Bombay State
Badminton venues
Basketball venues in India
20th-century architecture in India